The Vancouver Foreign Ministers’ Meeting on Security and Stability on Korean Peninsula was held on January 16, 2018 in Vancouver, Canada.  The meeting was to allow "foreign ministers to discuss ways to increase the effectiveness of the global sanctions regime in support of a rules-based international order."

Background
The meeting was announced after North Korea tested its latest long range intercontinental ballistic missile in late November, but was held amid signs that tensions on the Korean peninsula easing with North and South Korea holding formal talks in January for the first time in two years and North Korea agreeing to participate in the 2018 Winter Olympics in a unified team with the South.

Meeting

The meeting was co-hosted by Canada and the USA.

Invited parties include: "South Korea, Japan, India, Britain, France and other countries who fought in the Korean War of 1950-53." with foreign ministers and senior officials from 20 nations actually attending the meeting.

Notable countries that had not been invited were China, North Korea and Russia. China and Russia criticized the gathering as potentially harmful to peace prospects on the Korean peninsula, with China calling out the meeting for representing a "Cold War mentality". Diplomats said China's absence would limit what could be achieved.

See also

 2017–18 North Korea crisis
 2017 North Korean missile tests
 2017 North Korean nuclear test
 Korean conflict
 List of North Korean missile tests

References

External links
 Vancouver Foreign Ministers’ Meeting on Security and Stability on Korean Peninsula at Canada.ca
 Reports on the Vancouver Summit on North Korea, and IAR Event
 
 
 
 
 
 
 
 
 

2018 in international relations
2018 conferences
2018 in Canadian politics
2010s in Vancouver
2018 in British Columbia
2018 in North Korea
Diplomatic conferences in Canada
21st-century diplomatic conferences
Aftermath of the Korean War
January 2018 events in Canada